Acanthothecis kalbii is a species of script lichen in the family Graphidaceae. It was described as a new species in 2009 by Manuela Dal-Forno and Sionara Eliasaro. The specific epithet honours German lichenologist Klaus Kalb.

Description
The lichen has a smooth, off-white thallus that grows on bark. It has oblong lirellae, the same colour as the thallus, measuring 0.3–0.9 mm long by 0.15–0.25 mm wide. Its ascospores, which number eight per ascus, are ellipsoid with 3 to 5 transverse septa; they measure 9–15 μm long by 4–5 μm wide. Norstictic acid is present in the thallus.

References

kalbii
Lichen species
Lichens described in 2009
Lichens of Brazil